Michael G. O'Brien (1933 – 14 November 2014) was an Irish Roman Catholic priest who was also a noted hurling coach and manager.

Born in Innishannon, County Cork, O'Brien was ordained into the priesthood in 1958. Over the next forty-five years he ministered in both Ireland and the United Kingdom, while also serving as a teacher at St. Finbarr's College and chaplain to the Irish Navy. O'Brien retired from active ministry in 2003.

Concurrently with his duties as a priest, O'Brien was heavily involved as a hurling coach at colleges, university, club and inter-county levels. His biggest success came with Cork, whom he steered to two All-Ireland titles, four Munster titles and one National Hurling League title.

Biography

O'Brien was born in the parish of Innishannon/Knockavilla, County Cork. He entered St Patrick's College, Maynooth, and was ordained for the Diocese of Cork and Ross in the seminary chapel on 22 June 1958. He then ministered in the Irish-emigrant areas of London until 1961, when he returned to his home diocese and a curacy in the parish of Blackrock, Cork, where he helped to rebuild St. Michael's Church which had burnt to the ground. For 12 years, from 1964 to 1976, O'Brien taught at St. Finbarr's Seminary, Farranferris, where he was also the hurling trainer for the school team.  He was "at the helm as Farranferris won Dr Harty Cups in 1969, 1971, 1972, 1973 and 1974, adding All-Irelands in 1972 and 1974". A 12-year stint as chaplain at the Naval Base of Haulbowline followed before O'Brien returned to parish ministry, again in Blackrock.  In 1985 he started a lengthy stay in Carrigaline where he served as curate, administrator and finally parish priest of Carrigaline, before retiring from active ministry in 2003.

O'Brien was later resident in Nazareth Home in Dromahane. He died on 14 November 2014 after a long illness.	

O'Brien served as the coach of the Cork senior hurling team on several occasions, guiding the team to All-Ireland titles in 1984 and 1990. .At colleges' level he also managed UCC to Fitzgibbon Cup titles, and later managed Blackrock GAA. He also helped coaching Coláiste Chríost Rí.

He is not to be confused with Canon Michael O'Brien of the neighbouring Roman Catholic Diocese of Cloyne.

Honours

Team

St. Finbarr's College
Dr. Croke Cup (3): 1969, 1972, 1974
Dr. Harty Cup (5): 1969, 1971, 1972, 1973, 1974

University College Cork
Fitzgibbon Cup (10): 1981, 1982, 1983, 1984, 1985, 1986, 1987, 1988, 1990, 1991

Argideen Rangers
Cork Junior Hurling Championship (1): 1996

Ballinhassig
Cork Intermediate Hurling Championship (2): 1975, 1977

Blackrock
Cork Senior Hurling Championship (2): 1985, 1999

Tracton
Cork Intermediate Hurling Championship (1): 1991
Cork Junior Hurling Championship (1): 1979

Cork
All-Ireland Senior Hurling Championship (2): 1984, 1990
Munster Senior Hurling Championship (5): 1984, 1985, 1990, 1992
National Hurling League (1): 1992-93
All-Ireland Junior Hurling Championship (1): 1983
All-Ireland Minor Hurling Championship (6): 1969, 1970, 1971, 1974, 1978, 1979
Philips Sports Manager of the Year (1): 1990

References

 

1933 births
2014 deaths
Hurling managers
Gaelic games players from County Cork
Alumni of St Patrick's College, Maynooth
20th-century Irish Roman Catholic priests
21st-century Irish Roman Catholic priests
Roman Catholic clergy in Europe